Brian Earnshaw (26 December 1929 - 15th February, 2014) was a British author,  known for his Dragonfall 5 series, illustrated by Simon Stern.

Earnshaw was born in Wrexham, Wales, and attended Pembroke College, Cambridge, where he read English. He then spent a number of years as a secondary school teacher in different locations in the UK. From 1964 until his retirement we was a lecturer in English Literature at St Paul's College, Cheltenham (a teacher training college with Bristol University qualifications). In 1982 he completed a doctorate at Warwick University with a thesis entitled 'Translations from German and their Reception in Britain 1760-1800'.  After retiring, he moved to Bristol, and worked with Timothy Mowl on a range of books on British architectural and garden history. These sometimes appear with Earnshaw as Mowl's co-author, and sometimes with him in Mowl's acknowledgement as a researcher. He had a great love of botany and travel, and made extensive trips around Europe and elsewhere studying flowers, architecture, gardens and history.

Bibliography

Series

Star Jam Pack
 Starclipper and the Song Wars (1985) 
 Starclipper on the Snowstone (1986) ISBN unknown
 Starclipper and the Galactic Final (1987)

Dragonfall 5

 Dragonfall 5 and the Royal Beast (1972) 
 Dragonfall 5 and the Space Cowboys (1972) 
 Dragonfall 5 and the Empty Planet (1973) 
 Dragonfall 5 and the Hijackers (1974) 
 Dragonfall 5 and the Master Mind (1975) 
 Dragonfall 5 and the Super Horse (1977) 
 Dragonfall 5 and the Haunted World (1979)

Adult novels
 And the Mistress Pursuing (1966) 
 Planet in the Eye of Time (1968)

Other teenage novels
 Planet of the Jumping Bears (1990) 
 The Rock Dog Gang (1987) 
 Next Stop, Wildstar (1994)

Non-fiction
Trumpet at a Distant Gate: The Lodge as Prelude to the Country House Timothy Mowl and Brian Earnshaw, London: Waterstones, 1985 
John Wood: Architect of Obsession Timothy Mowl and Brian Earnshaw, Bath: Millstream Books, 1988 
 Architecture Without Kings: The Rise of Puritan Classicism under Cromwell, Timothy Mowl and Brian Earnshaw,  New York: Manchester Univ. Press, 1995 (Sept.) , 
 AN INSULAR ROCOCO Architecture, Politics and Society in Ireland and England, 1710–1770, Timothy Mowl and Brian Earnshaw, 1999

Poetry
At St. David's A Year, London: Hodder & Stoughton, 1968 
Cavafy Gone Gothic, Bristol: Redcliffe Press, 2008

External links
Brian Earnshaw & guest

1929 births
Living people
People from Wrexham
Alumni of St John's College, Cambridge
British science fiction writers